Michał Potoczny (born 10 January 1995) is a Polish handball player for MMTS Kwidzyn and the Polish national team.

References 

1995 births
Living people
Polish male handball players
Sportspeople from Olsztyn